The La Mouette Topless is a French single-place, hang glider that was designed and produced by La Mouette.

Design and development
The Topless was introduced in 1995 and was the first commercially produced modern hang glider without a kingpost and upper flying wires. Intended as a competition glider, it was based on the development work of Christof Krazner.

The aircraft is made from aluminum tubing, with the wing covered in Dacron sailcloth. It was built in three different sizes, designated by their metric wing areas and all with a nose angle of 132°.

Variants
Topless 11
Small-size model for lighter pilots.
Topless 12.8
Medium-size model for mid-weight pilots.
Topless 13.5
Large-size model for heavier pilots.

Specifications (Topless 12.8)

References

External links
Photo of a Topless

Topless
Hang gliders